"The Horla" (French: Le Horla) is an 1887 short horror story written in the style of a journal by the French writer Guy de Maupassant, after an initial, much shorter version published in the newspaper Gil Blas, October 26, 1886.

The story has been cited as an inspiration for Lovecraft's  "The Call of Cthulhu", which also features an extraterrestrial being who influences minds and who is destined to conquer humanity.

The word horla itself is not French, and is a neologism. Charlotte Mandell, who has translated "The Horla" for publisher Melville House, suggests in an afterword that the word "horla" is a portmanteau of the French words hors ("outside"), and là ("there") and that "le horla" sounds like "the Outsider, the outer, the one Out There", and can be transliterally interpreted as "the 'what's out there'".

Summary
In the form of a journal, the narrator, an upper-class, unmarried, bourgeois man, conveys his troubled thoughts and feelings of anguish. This anguish occurs for four days after he sees a "superb three-mast" Brazilian ship and impulsively waves to it, unconsciously inviting the supernatural being aboard the boat to haunt his home.

All around him, he senses the presence of a being that he calls the "Horla". The torment that the Horla causes is first manifested physically: The narrator complains that he suffers from "an atrocious fever", and that he has trouble sleeping. He wakes up from nightmares with the chilling feeling that someone is watching him and "kneeling on [his] chest".

Throughout the short story, the main character's sanity, or rather, his feelings of alienation, are put into question as the Horla progressively dominates his thoughts. Initially, the narrator himself questions his sanity, exclaiming "Am I going mad?" after having found his glass of water empty, despite not having drunk from it. He later decides that he is not, in fact, going mad, since he is fully "conscious" of his "state" and that he could indeed "analyze it with the most complete lucidity." The presence of the Horla becomes more and more intolerable to the protagonist, as it is "watching ... looking at ... [and] dominating" him.

After reading about a large number of Brazilians who fled their homes, bemoaning the fact that "they are pursued, possessed, governed like human cattle by ... a species of vampire, which feeds on their life while they are asleep ... [and] drinks water", the narrator soon realizes the Horla was aboard the Brazilian three-mast boat that he had previously greeted. He feels so "lost" and "possessed" to the point that he is ready to kill the Horla. The narrator traps the Horla in a room and sets fire to the house, but forgets his servants, who perish in the fire. In the last lines of the story, faced with the persistence of the Horla's presence, he concludes suicide to be his only liberation.

Influences

Literature
"The Horla" is used as an extension of the plot in the short story "The Theater Upstairs" by Manly Wade Wellman. In Wellman's novel Sherlock Holmes' War of the Worlds (1975), Sherlock Holmes suggests to Professor Challenger that the events of "The Horla" might actually be true.
 The Bartimaeus Trilogy (2003–2010) features  as powerful spirits, who appear as shadowy apparitions that cause madness in humans similar to the titular Horla of the short story.
American horror writer H. P. Lovecraft, in his survey "Supernatural Horror in Literature" (1927), provides his own interpretation of the story:

 "The Horla" is the inspiration for Robert Sheckley's short story "The New Horla" (2000) in his collection Uncanny Tales.
 Kingsley Amis's first novel Lucky Jim (1954, chapter 6) describes Jim Dixon, a guest lecturer at a university, waking in a guestroom owned by the senior colleague whose good will he is depending on to continue in his job the next academic year, discovering he has fallen asleep drunk, and burned holes through blankets and sheets and on a bedside table. "Had he done this all to himself? Or had a wayfarer, a burglar, camped out in his room? Or was he the victim of some Horla fond of tobacco?"

Popular culture

 The movie Diary of a Madman (1963) is loosely based on "The Horla".
 The Star Trek episode "Wolf in the Fold" (1967) features a Horla-like entity.
 Jean-Daniel Pollet directed a film adaptation called Le Horla in 1966.
 The CBS Radio Mystery Theater adapted the story for episode 044, originally aired on February 22, 1974.
 The Hall of Fantasy radio show aired an episode on September 5, 1952, called "The Shadow People", which makes reference to the Horla.
 "The Horla" (1947) is episode 8 of Peter Lorre's radio serial Mystery in the Air.
 "The Horla" was adapted for the syndicated radio program The Weird Circle.
 Horlas are mentioned or featured in several stories from the Tales of the Shadowmen series, including one story where a Horla is encountered by Solomon Kane.
 Tim Lucas has argued that "The Horla" is also an influence on Mario Bava's story "Telephone", featured in his film Black Sabbath (1963).
 "The Horla" is the title of a song from the British heavy metal band Angel Witch, appearing on their 2012 album As Above, So Below.
 The concept album D'Après Le Horla De Maupassant by Canadian progressive rock band The Box is based on "The Horla".
 The third track of French hip-hop artist Nekfeu's debut album, Feu, is entitled "Le Horla".

References

External links

 
 Full English text of "The Horla" second version (University of Virginia Electronic Text Center) (archived link)
 Full English text of "The Horla" (from East of the Web)
 Full French text of "Le Horla" (Project Gutenberg)
 Free audiobook : Le Horla (in French)
 The Horla starring Peter Lorre, Mystery in the Air, NBC radio, August 21, 1947
 
 

1887 short stories
Short stories by Guy de Maupassant
Horror short stories
Fiction with unreliable narrators
Short stories adapted into films
Fictional diaries
Works originally published in Gil Blas (periodical)